Gajo Petrović (12 March 1927 – 13 June 1993) was one of the main theorists in the Marxist humanist Praxis School in the Socialist Federal Republic of Yugoslavia. He was the only one among the editors of the Praxis journal to stay in this position throughout the journal's publication. He is credited by Milan Kangrga to be the mastermind behind the Korčula Summer School, which was a meeting place for Marxists and other philosophers from the East and the West in the 1960s and 1970s.

Biography
Petrović was born on 12 March 1927 in Karlovac, Kingdom of Serbs, Croats and Slovenes. He has started learning philosophy at the University of Zagreb. From 1946 to 1948 he was in the Soviet Union as an exchange student, where he recognized the repression of philosophical thought under Joseph Stalin. After that, he came back to Yugoslavia, completing his studies and earned his PhD at the University of Zagreb in 1956 with a dissertation concerning the philosophical views of Georgi Plekhanov. Upon graduating, from 1950 he taught logic and theory of philosophy at this university until his retirement. He presided over the Croat Philosophical Society from 1963 to 1964. In 1964 he was elected for president of the Yugoslav Philosophical Society.

Petrović was one of the leaders of the Yugoslav criticism of the Stalinist philosophical theses since the early 1950s. In the early 1960s, his philosophical views evolved towards an interpretation of Marxism based on the philosophical works of the young Karl Marx. This was in line with the creative line of thought of a self-management socialism which dominated the Yugoslav political landscape at the time. However, his continuous radical criticism of the dogmatic ideology of the League of Communists of Yugoslavia led to an open conflict. In 1968 Petrović openly supported the student protests, which was a pretext for his expulsion from the party at June 8 meeting of the Zagreb University Party Committee.

Petrović's Selected Works in four volumes were published in 1986. In 2001, a collection of articles in his honour were published in Zagreb, entitled The Reality and the Criticism.

Petrović died on 13 June 1993.

Philosophical views

Petrović has opposed the interpretation of Marx's philosophical views as dialectical materialism and has insisted that the Marx's philosophy was thought of the revolution which is contemplating the possibility of revolutionary change of the existing inhuman world.

Major works
Engleska empiristička filozofija. Odabrani tekstovi filozofa (The English Empiricist Philosophy) (1955)
The Philosophical Views of G. V. Plekhanov (1957)
Logic (1964). [Ital. transl. Logica per la III classe dei ginnasi, 1968]
 Od Lockea do Ayera. (From Locke to Ayer) (1964)
Philosophy and Marxism (1965) (published in English under the title Marx in the Mid-Twentieth Century: A Yugoslav Philosopher Considers Karl Marx's Writings (New York: Doubleday & Company, 1967) 
The Possibility of Man (1969)
Philosophy and Revolution (1971)
Why Praxis (1972)
The Thought of Revolution (1978)
Marx and the Marxists (1986)
U potrazi za slobodom: povijesno-filozofski ogledi (In Quest of Liberty) (1990)

Notes

References

External links
Gajo Petrović Archive
Biography of Gajo Petrović
The History and the Nature (in Serbo-Croatian)
The Power, Violence and Humanity (in Serbo-Croatian)
I Admit (in Croatian)
Article by Dušan Žubrinić about Gajo Petrović (in Serbo-Croatian)
Gajo Petrović - čovjek i filozof  
Gajo Petrović, filozof iz Karlovca 

1927 births
1993 deaths
Marxist theorists
Marxist humanists
Yugoslav atheists
Yugoslav humanists
Faculty of Humanities and Social Sciences, University of Zagreb alumni
Academic staff of the University of Zagreb
People from Karlovac
Burials at Mirogoj Cemetery
Yugoslav philosophers